Xiaohong Rose Yang is an American biomedical scientist researching the genetics of dysplastic nevus syndrome and chordoma, and etiologic heterogeneity of breast cancer. She is a senior investigator at the National Cancer Institute. Yang leads breast cancer studies in mainland China, Hong Kong, and Malaysia.

Education 
Yang received a Ph.D. in physiology at Georgetown University's Lombardi Comprehensive Cancer Center in 1999. Her dissertation was titled KAI1, A Metastasis Suppressor Gene for Human Breast Cancer. Yang's mentors were Marc E. Lippman, Careen K. Tang, and Lisa L. Wei. She completed a M.P.H. in epidemiology from the Johns Hopkins Bloomberg School of Public Health in 2003. Yang joined the genetic epidemiology branch (GEB) at the National Cancer Institute (NCI) in 2000 as a postdoctoral fellow.

Career 
Yang became a tenure-track investigator at the NCI in 2006, and was appointed senior investigator upon receiving NIH scientific tenure in 2014. , she is a senior investigator. Yang serves on the editorial board for Cancer Epidemiology, Biomarkers & Prevention, and is an adjunct associate professor at the Chinese University of Hong Kong. Her research interests include the genetics of dysplastic nevi syndrome and chordoma, and etiologic heterogeneity of breast cancer.

Research 
Through a genome-wide search for copy number variations (CNVs), Yang identified the first susceptibility gene for familial chordoma—a germline duplication of the T gene that had eluded previous studies that focused on single nucleotide variants. Using funding from a 2008 NCI Division of Cancer Epidemiology and Genetics (DCEG) Intramural Research Award, she applied the same technique in melanoma-prone families and identified a germline duplication in a family without mutations in known melanoma genes. She presented these findings at the 2014 NCI Intramural Research Retreat.

Yang uses genomic technologies and statistical approaches to evaluate copy number and exome sequencing variants, as well as mRNA expression, miRNA expression, DNA methylation, chromatin modification, and telomere length in disease susceptibility. Yang and her colleagues identified a rare inherited mutation in a gene involved in maintaining telomere stability in melanoma families, further supporting a role for abnormal telomeres in the development of melanoma.

In her investigation of etiologic heterogeneity of breast cancer, Yang characterizes the molecular signature of tumors using tissue microarray and integrated tumor profiling analyses to identify risk factors for specific cancer subtypes. She leads breast cancer studies in mainland China, Hong Kong, and Malaysia to identify distinct molecular alterations in tumors and adjacent normal tissues among Asian women, and to examine the associations of these molecular changes with genetic and environmental risk factors, breast tissue composition and density, and breast cancer subtypes.

Awards and honors 
Yang received NCI Director’s Intramural Innovation Awards in 2007 and 2009.

Selected works

References

External links
 

Living people
Year of birth missing (living people)
Place of birth missing (living people)
21st-century American women scientists
21st-century American biologists
American women biologists
American medical researchers
Women medical researchers
Cancer researchers
Georgetown University alumni
National Institutes of Health people
Johns Hopkins Bloomberg School of Public Health alumni